Marija Vojinović is a Serbian politician. She was elected to the National Assembly of Serbia in 2022 and serves as a member of the Movement for the Restoration of the Kingdom of Serbia (Pokret obnove Kraljevine Srbije, POKS).

Private life and career
Vojinović was born in Užice, in what was then the Socialist Republic of Serbia in the Socialist Federal Republic of Yugoslavia. She has completed undergraduate and master's studies in Belgrade and is a master manager in the service sector. She lives in Novi Sad, Vojvodina.

Politician
Vojinović joined POKS on its formation in 2017 and is currently the secretary of its executive board. She received the fifth position on the party's electoral list in the 2020 Vojvodina provincial election and was elected to the Assembly of Vojvodina when the list won five mandates. She chose to decline her mandate, and the next candidate on the list, Novak Maksimović, was able to enter the assembly in her place. She also received the ninth position on the POKS's list for the national assembly in the concurrent 2020 Serbian parliamentary election. The list narrowly missed crossing the electoral threshold to win representation.

The POKS experienced a serious split in late 2021, and the party divided into rival factions led by Vojislav Mihailović and Žika Gojković. Vojinović joined Mihailović's group, which contested the 2022 Serbian parliamentary election as part of the National Democratic Alternative (Nacionalno demokratska alternativa, NADA) alliance. Due to an ongoing dispute over the party name, Mihailović's group could not be identified as the POKS; it instead used the name "For the Kingdom of Serbia (Monarchists)." Vojinović was given the fifth position on the alliance's list and was elected when it won fifteen mandates. Soon after the election, Mihailović was recognized as the legitimate leader of the POKS.

The 2022 election was won by the Serbian Progressive Party (Srpska napredna stranka, SNS) and its allies, and the NADA alliance serves in opposition. Vojinović is a member of the health and family committee and a deputy member of the committee on human and minority rights and gender equality.

References

1980 births
Living people
Politicians from Užice
Politicians from Novi Sad
Members of the National Assembly (Serbia)
Movement for the Restoration of the Kingdom of Serbia politicians
Women members of the National Assembly (Serbia)